Wolves of Vučjak was a paramilitary unit active in the Croatian War of Independence and the Bosnian War. It was established in Prnjavor, Bosnia and Herzegovina.

They were active in fighting in Okučani, Jasenovac and Novska. In August, 1991 the unit took over the transmitter on Kozara, and replaced RTV Sarajevo with Serb programming. Its leader Veljko Milanković was badly wounded on February 4, 1993 and later died at the Medical Academy on February 14.

A witness testified to the International Criminal Tribunal for the former Yugoslavia during Serbian leader Slobodan Milošević's trial that the Wolves were trained in Knin by Dragan Vasiljković, "Captain Dragan".

In 2007, it was announced that the paramilitary's commander Veljko Milanković would have a street named after him in Novi Sad.  Non-governmental groups protested the decision.

See also
Serbian paramilitary

References

External links
 Са сведочења на суђењу Радославу Брђанину, изјава сведока, 11. новембар 2003.
 Fond za humanitarno pravo, наводе га као команданта јединице "Вукови са Мањаче"
 Дневник онлајн, 30 March 2007
 Глас јавности, Министарство против "Вукова с Вучјака", 2. јун 2007

Military units and formations of the Croatian War of Independence
Military units and formations of the Bosnian War
Paramilitary organizations based in Serbia
1991 establishments in Bosnia and Herzegovina
Military units and formations established in 1991
History of the Serbs of Bosnia and Herzegovina
Paramilitary organizations in the Yugoslav Wars
Organizations disestablished in 1995